The 2018 Moldovan "B" Division was the 28th season of Moldovan football's third-tier league. The season started on 5 May 2018 and ended on 10 November 2018. The league consisted of three regional groups, Nord (North), Centru (Centre) and Sud (South).

North

Results 
The schedule consists of two rounds, each team plays each other once home-and-away for a total of 16 matches per team.

Centre

Results 
The schedule consists of two rounds, each team plays each other once home-and-away for a total of 18 matches per team.

South

Results 
The schedule consists of two rounds, each team plays each other once home-and-away for a total of 12 matches per team.

References

External links
 Divizia B - Results, fixtures, tables and news - Soccerway

Moldovan Liga 2 seasons
Moldova 3